Iran: Religion, Politics, and Society is a book by Nikki R. Keddie which is about religion, politics and society in Iran. Frank Cass Publishers and Routledge published the book in 1980 and 1983, respectively.

Parts
Part 1 covers religion and politics: religion and irreligion in early Iranian nationalism; the origins of the religious-radical alliance in Iran; popular participation in the Persian revolution of 1905 to 1911; and religion and society in Iran.

Part 2 covers socio-economic change: the economic history of Iran 1800 to 1914 and its political impact; Iran 1797 to 1941; stratification, social control and capitalism in Iranian villages - before and after land reform; oil, economic policy and social change in Iran.

Editions
 Frank Cass Publishers (1980)
 Routledge (1983)

References

1980 non-fiction books
1983 non-fiction books
British books
History books about Iran
Religion in Iran